The Daniel O'Connell House is a historic house located at 115 North Union Street in Vermont, Illinois. Daniel O'Connell, a local banker and lumber salesman, had the house built in 1928. The house, which was built by contractor Fred Rankin, has an American Foursquare plan with American Craftsman elements. The Foursquare plan, which had become popular at the time for its simplicity, is reflected in the house's square shape and massiveness. The brick piers at the entrance and the horizontal emphasis of the exterior design both reflect the Craftsman style; the style also inspired several interior elements, such as seating and shelves, which are built into the home.

The house was added to the National Register of Historic Places on November 7, 1996.

References

Houses on the National Register of Historic Places in Illinois
Houses completed in 1928
National Register of Historic Places in Fulton County, Illinois
American Foursquare architecture in Illinois
American Craftsman architecture in Illinois
Vermont, Illinois